The 2005 European Youth Olympic Winter Festival was held in Monthey, Switzerland,  between 24 and 28 January 2005.

Sports

Results

Alpine skiing

Biathlon

Cross-country skiing

Curling

Figure skating

Ice hockey

Short track speed skating

Snowboarding

Medal table

References

External links
 Results

European Youth Olympic Winter Festival
European Youth Olympic Winter Festival
European Youth Olympic Winter Festival
European Youth Olympic Winter Festival
International sports competitions hosted by Switzerland
Youth sport in Switzerland
Sports festivals in Switzerland
2005 in youth sport
January 2005 sports events in Europe
Monthey